Thomas Edward Graham, Baron Graham of Edmonton,  (26 March 1925 – 21 March 2020) was a British Labour and Co-operative politician.

Career

Born in Newcastle, Graham was educated at the Co-operative College and held several positions in the co-operative movement from 1939, becoming National Secretary for the Co-operative Party.

During the Second World War he saw active service in the British Army and was seriously injured by enemy fire. Graham was a councillor on Enfield Borough Council from 1961, joining the new London Borough of Enfield in 1964 and becoming its leader for ten years.

In 1966, Graham contested Enfield West at that year's general election. He was Member of Parliament for Edmonton from February 1974, serving as a Parliamentary Private Secretary at the Department of Prices and Consumer Protection from 1974 to 1976, then as a government whip from 1976 to 1979, with the title of Lord Commissioner of the Treasury.

He was an opposition spokesman on the environment from 1980 to 1983, when he lost his seat in the House of Commons to Ian Twinn as part of Labour's landslide election defeat of that year.

On 12 September 1983, after losing his seat, Graham was created a life peer as Baron Graham of Edmonton, of Edmonton in Greater London. He was Labour Chief Whip 1990–97. He was chairman of the Co-operative Council, and served as President of the 1987 Co-operative Congress.

Graham was President of the Institute of Meat and Patron of the Ancient Order of Foresters and of the Edmonton Constituency Labour Party.

Political career 

On 18 December 1986, Graham was the only Peer in the House of Lords to speak against Lord Halsbury's Local Government Act 1986 (Amendment) Bill, which sought to prohibit the "promotion of homosexuality" by local authorities. This bill subsequently became law as Section 28 of the Local Government Act 1988, when it was reintroduced by David Wilshire MP in the Commons.

Personal life
Graham married Margaret Golding in 1950. The couple had two sons. His wife was diagnosed with myotonic dystrophy, a condition that both their sons would inherit; she died in 2005 and their sons shortly thereafter.

Graham was a first cousin of Dr. Miriam Stoppard, Lady Hogg, a physician, and her son, actor Ed Stoppard, Miriam's son, as well as politician Oona King, Lady Hogg's's niece. He was a supporter of Humanists UK and lived in Loughton, Essex.

He died in Hertfordshire on 21 March 2020, aged 94.

References

Sources 
Times Guide to the House of Commons, 1966 & 1983

External links 
 

|-

|-

1925 births
2020 deaths
Alumni of the Co-operative College
British humanists
Councillors in the London Borough of Enfield
Councillors in Greater London
General Secretaries of the Co-operative Party
Labour Co-operative MPs for English constituencies
Graham of Edmonton
Members of the Privy Council of the United Kingdom
Presidents of Co-operative Congress
British Army personnel of World War II
UK MPs 1974
UK MPs 1974–1979
UK MPs 1979–1983
Life peers created by Elizabeth II